SS Torrington was a British cargo steamship that was built in England in 1905, owned and registered in Wales, and sunk by a German U-boat in 1917. She was a turret deck ship: an unusual hull design that was developed by William Doxford & Sons of Sunderland in the 1890s.

In April 1917  sank Torrington in the Celtic Sea southwest of the Isles of Scilly. Her crew survived the sinking, but U-55s commander Wilhelm Werner murdered many of them by drowning. Werner evaded prosecution, later became a senior officer in the SS, and died just after the Second World War.

Building and registration
In 1905 Doxford's built a pair of sister ships at their Pallion shipyard. Yard number 330 was launched on 21 February, completed in March and named Wellington. Yard number 332 was launched on 21 March, completed in April and named Torrington.

Each ship had a three-cylinder triple-expansion engine that was rated at 359 NHP.

William J Tatem and Company, Limited managed both ships. Tatem created two one-ship companies to own the ships: the Wellington Steam Ship Company and the Torrington Steam Ship Company. Tatem registered each ship in Cardiff. Torringtons UK official number was 119969 and her code letters were HCLV.

In 1910 Tatem transferred ownership of both Wellington and Torrington to the Tatem Steam Navigation Company Limited. WJ Tatem & Co remained the manager of both ships.

Sinking
Early in 1917 Torrington took coal from Wales to Savona, Italy, for Italian State Railways. On 8 April 1917 she was returning to Barry for her next cargo. Torringtons Captain, Anthony Starkey, changed course toward the boats, which carried survivors of Umvoti, a Bullard, King & Co steamship that U-55 had sunk.

U-55 then fired a torpedo at Torrington. Starkey saw it and changed course in response, but failed to avoid it. It hit hold number 3 just forward of the bridge, quickly flooding both that hold and hold number two further forward. This put Torrington down by her bow, lifting her propeller out of the water and bringing her to a halt.

U-55 surfaced off Torrington starboard bow. Torrington was defensively armed with a naval gun on her poop, Torringtons superstructure amidships blocked it from being brought to bear on the U-boat. Starkey surrendered, ordered Torringtons ensign to be lowered and ordered his crew to abandon ship. Starkey took command of 20 men in the starboard lifeboat, while his Chief Officer commanded 15 men in the port lifeboat.

Having pulled  from Torrington, U-55 fired a shell from her deck gun that exploded above Starkey's lifeboat. Starkey moved the boat to the submarine and those aboard were ordered onto its deck. Werner took Starkey below for interrogation. Werner accused Starkey of lying by stating that he was captain, as Werner's copy of Lloyd's Register of Shipping named a different man. Starkey had been appointed only four months prior, and the register was out of date. Werner asked Starkey about the crew of the defensive gun. Starkey indicated they were among the 20 men on his lifeboat. When asked why they were not wearing uniform Starkey, said they had not had time to change before sinking.

Werner told Starkey he was "a damned pirate" and that he deserved "to be shot, and as for the others, let them swim". Starkey assumed the latter was a German expression and assumed his men had been allowed to reboard their boat and continue at sea. But U-55 submerged with the men still on her deck, and all were drowned. The fate of the port boat is not known, but it is thought to have also been sunk by Werner. Starkey remained aboard U-55 for the remaining 15 days of its cruise, and was then interned in Germany.

During the trip a German sailor asked Starkey if he thought his crew had survived. Starkey said he thought they would as the weather was not poor. The sailor then told Starkey that he knew all his crew had died, but could not tell him more in front of the other Germans. Another sailor told Starkey that the event was "not war, it was murder". Whilst aboard Starkey, later noted that he had seen two other British ships sunk and their crews murdered. U-55 reached Germany on 23 April after a cruise in which she sank 10 ships, totalling , and killed 100 seafarers. Starkey was held in an internment camp and thought he had only been allowed to live because Werner did not suspect he knew the truth about the murders.

Later events
Later in the war Werner and U-55 sank the hospital ship  and fired at the hospital ship Guildford Castle with a torpedo that failed to explode. On 31 July 1917 he murdered the crew of the Prince Line cargo ship Belgian Prince in a similar manner to that of the crew of Torrington, but three men survived as witnesses.

After the war it was proposed to try Werner at the Leipzig war crimes trials for the murder of the crew of Torrington, but he could not be found. He had fled to Brazil, but he returned to Germany in 1924, and the charges against him were dropped by a German court in 1926. He later joined the Nazi Party and served in the SS, and was promoted to the rank of Brigadeführer in Heinrich Himmler's personal staff. Werner died in May 1945, shortly after the end of World War II in Europe.

References

Bibliography

External link

1905 ships
Maritime incidents in 1917
Ships built on the River Wear
Ships sunk by German submarines in World War I
Steamships of the United Kingdom
World War I merchant ships of the United Kingdom
World War I shipwrecks in the Atlantic Ocean